Petchtanong Petchfergus (born November 6, 1985) is a Thai Muay Thai kickboxer fighting out of Bangkok. He is currently signed to ONE Championship, where he is the reigning ONE Bantamweight Kickboxing World Champion. 

As of February 2021, he is the #7 ranked super featherweight according to Combat Press. He was ranked a top ten featherweight in the world by Combat Press between February 2019 and September 2020. He was dropped from the rankings in October 2020.

Biography

Petchtanong started training in Muay Thai at 7 years old in a small camp close to his home. He quickly went to the live at the camp full time to escape an abusive familial situation.

At 12, he moved to Bangkok following his mom. There he joined the Sit.Or gym through his uncle which took him to a level high enough to headline shows at Rajadamnern and Lumpinee stadiums at the age of 14.

After changing gyms multiple times, Petchtanong was later sponsored by the Banchamek gym and went living, teaching and fighting in Australia for 2 years.

He came back to Thailand in 2015 and went on a winning streak in the Super Muay Thai promotion. He received calls to participate in various kickboxing world tournaments in China, prominently Kunlun Fight and Wu Lin Feng.

On January 19, 2019, he won the Wu Lin Feng World Cup final, defeating Jomthong Chuwattana.

Petchtanong participated in the 2020 Wu Lin Feng 67 tournament. He won the semifinal bout against Liu Yaning by KO, but lost a unanimous decision to Jia Aoqi in the finals.

ONE Championship
On August 18, 2020, Petchtanong signed with ONE Championship. In his debut at ONE Championship: A New Breed 3 on September 18, 2020, Petchtanong lost by knockout to Capitan Petchyindee Academy just 6 seconds into the first round, setting a new record for fastest knockout in ONE Super Series history.

Petchtanong made his sophomore appearance in the promotion against Zhang Chenglong at ONE Championship: Revolution on September 24, 2021. He won the bout via unanimous decision.

Petchtanong was scheduled to face Hiroki Akimoto for the ONE Bantamweight Kickboxing World Championship at ONE 163 on November 18, 2022. He won the fight by split decision.

Championship and achievements
 ONE Championship
 ONE Bantamweight Kickboxing World Championship (One time, current) 
 Wu Lin Feng (WLF)
 2019 Wu Lin Feng World Cup -67 kg Runner-up
 2018 Wu Lin Feng World Cup -67 kg Champion
 Enfusion 
 2017 Enfusion -67 kg Tournament Champion
 International Professional Combat Council (IPCC)  
 2015 IPCC World Muay Thai -67 kg Champion
 World Muaythai Council (WMC) 
 2012 WMC World -66 kg Champion
Beyond Kickboxing
2022 Beyond Kick "Upset of the Year"

Fight record

|-  style="background:#cfc;"
| 2022-11-19 || Win ||align=left| Hiroki Akimoto || ONE 163: Akimoto vs. Petchtanong || Kallang, Singapore || Decision (Split) || 5 || 3:00
|-
! style=background:white colspan=9 |
|-  style="background:#cfc;"
| 2021-09-24|| Win ||align=left| Zhang Chenglong || ONE Championship: Revolution || Singapore || Decision (Unanimous) || 3 || 3:00 
|-  style="background:#fbb;"
| 2020-09-18 || Loss ||align=left| Capitan Petchyindee Academy || ONE Championship: A New Breed 3 || Bangkok, Thailand || KO (Right cross) || 1 || 0:06
|-  style="background:#fbb;"
| 2020-01-11 ||Loss||align=left| Jia Aoqi || Wu Lin Feng 2020: WLF World Cup 2019-2020 Final, Final|| Zhuhai, China ||Decision (Unanimous) || 3 || 3:00
|-
! style=background:white colspan=9 |
|-  style="background:#cfc;"
| 2020-01-11 ||Win ||align=left| Liu Yaning || Wu Lin Feng 2020: WLF World Cup 2019-2020 Final, Semi Final|| Zhuhai, China ||TKO || 1 || 0:50
|-  style="background:#CCFFCC;"
| 2019-10-26 || Win ||align=left| Yuya Yamato || Wu Lin Feng 2019: WLF -67kg World Cup 2019-2020 5th Group Stage || Zhengzhou, China || Decision (Unanimous) || 3 || 3:00
|-  style="background:#CCFFCC;"
| 2019-08-31 || Win ||align=left| Liu Jianbo || Wu Lin Feng 2019: WLF -67kg World Cup 2019-2020 3rd Group Stage || Zhengzhou, China || TKO (Left Straight) || 1 || 2:00
|-  style="background:#CCFFCC;"
| 2019-06-29 || Win ||align=left| Xie Lei || Wu Lin Feng 2019: WLF -67kg World Cup 2019-2020 1st Group Stage|| Zhengzhou, China || Decision  || 3 || 3:00
|-  style="background:#CCFFCC;"
| 2019-01-19 || Win ||align=left| Jomthong Chuwattana || Wu Lin Feng 2019: WLF World Cup 2018-2019 Final, Final  || Haikou, China  || Decision (Unanimous) || 3 || 3:00
|-
! style=background:white colspan=9 |
|-  style="background:#CCFFCC;"
| 2019-01-19 || Win ||align=left| Yang Zhuo || Wu Lin Feng 2019: WLF World Cup 2018-2019 Final, Semi Finals  || Haikou, China  || Decision (Unanimous) || 3 || 3:00
|-  style="background:#CCFFCC;"
| 2018-11-03 || Win ||align=left| Xie Lei || Wu Lin Feng 2018: WLF -67kg World Cup 2018-2019 5th Round || China || Decision (Unanimous) || 3 || 3:00
|-  style="background:#CCFFCC;"
| 2018-09-01 || Win ||align=left| Lu Jun || Wu Lin Feng 2018: WLF -67kg World Cup 2018-2019 3rd Round || Zhengzhou, China || Decision (Unanimous) || 3 || 3:00
|-  style="background:#CCFFCC;"
| 2018-07-07 || Win ||align=left| Zhang Junyu || Wu Lin Feng 2018: WLF -67kg World Cup 2018-2019 1st Round || Zhengzhou, China || Decision (Unanimous) || 3 || 3:00
|-  style="background:#CCFFCC;"
| 2018-05-21|| Win ||align=left| Niclas Larsen || All Star Fight 4 || Hong Kong || Decision (Unanimous) || 3 || 3:00
|-  style="background:#CCFFCC;"
| 2018-04-28|| Win ||align=left| Sergey Kulyaba || All Star Fight 3 || Bangkok, Thailand || Decision (Unanimous) || 3 || 3:00
|-  style="background:#CCFFCC;"
| 2017-12-08 || Win ||align=left| Youssef El Haji || Enfusion #59, -67 kg Tournament, Final || Abu Dhabi || Decision (Unanimous) || 3 || 3:00
|-
! style=background:white colspan=9 |
|-  style="background:#CCFFCC;"
| 2017-12-08 || Win ||align=left| Walid Hamid || Enfusion #59, -67 kg Tournament, Semi Finals || Abu Dhabi || Decision (Unanimous) || 3 || 3:00
|-  style="background:#FFBBBB;"
| 2017-11-12 || Loss ||align=left| Ilias Bulaid || Kunlun Fight 67 - 66kg World Championship, Quarter Finals || Sanya, China || Decision (Unanimous) || 3 || 3:00
|-  style="background:#c5d2ea;"
| 2017-10-07 || Draw ||align=left| Nayanesh Ayman || MBK Fight Night || Bangkok, Thailand || Decision || 3 || 3:00
|-  style="background:#CCFFCC;"
| 2017-08-27 || Win ||align=left| Yuya Yamato || Kunlun Fight 65, -66kg World Championship, 1/8 Finals || China || Decision (Unanimous) || 3 || 3:00
|- style="background:#FFBBBB;"
| 2017-07-28|| Loss  ||align=left| Jo Nattawut || Lion Fight 37 || Ledyard, United States || Decision (Unanimous) || 5 || 3:00
|-
! style=background:white colspan=9 |
|-  style="background:#CCFFCC;"
| 2017-04-01 || Win ||align=left| Manaowan Sitsongpeenong || Super Muaythai || Bangkok, Thailand || Decision || 3 || 3:00
|-  style="background:#CCFFCC;"
| 2017-02-07 || Win ||align=left| Mohammed El-Mir || Super Muaythai || Bangkok, Thailand || Decision || 3 || 3:00
|-  style="background:#CCFFCC;"
| 2016-12-09 || Win ||align=left| Liu ||  || China || TKO  || 1 || 1:37
|-  style="background:#CCFFCC;"
| 2016-09-10 || Win ||align=left| Buray Bozaryilmaz || Kunlun Fight 51, - 66kg World Championship, 1/8 Finals || China || TKO (Technical Decision) || 3 ||
|-  style="background:#CCFFCC;"
| 2016-08-07 || Win ||align=left| Tetsuya Yamato || Kunlun Fight 49 / Rebels 45, - 66kg World Championship, First Round || China || Decision (Unanimous) || 3 || 3:00
|-  style="background:#CCFFCC;"
| 2016-05-29 || Win ||align=left| Craig Suthai || SUPER MUAYTHAI  || Bangkok, Thailand || Decision (Unanimous) || 3 || 3:00
|-  style="background:#CCFFCC;"
| 2016-03-20 || Win ||align=left| Chris 7MuayThai || SUPER MUAYTHAI  || Bangkok, Thailand || Decision (Unanimous) || 3 || 3:00
|-  style="background:#CCFFCC;"
| 2016-03-20 || Win ||align=left| Hamza Bekkouri || SUPER MUAYTHAI  || Bangkok, Thailand || TKO (Low kick) || 2 ||
|-  style="background:#CCFFCC;"
| 2015-12-12 || Win ||align=left| Igor Liubchenko|| SUPER MUAYTHAI  || Bangkok, Thailand || Decision (Unanimous) || 3 || 3:00 
|-
! style=background:white colspan=9 |
|-  style="background:#CCFFCC;"
| 2015-11-07 || Win ||align=left| Aitor Alonso || SUPER MUAYTHAI  || Bangkok, Thailand || Decision (Unanimous) || 3 || 3:00
|-  style="background:#CCFFCC;"
| 2015-09-28 || Win ||align=left| Gu Hui || Kunlun Fight 31 || China || Decision (Unanimous) || 3 || 3:00
|-  style="background:#CCFFCC;"
| 2014-10-11 || Win ||align=left| Clayton Cook || Legal Assault VIII || Australia || Decision (Unanimous) || 5 || 3:00
|-  style="background:#CCFFCC;"
| 2014-08-03 || Win ||align=left| Beniah Douma || || Australia || Decision (Unanimous) || 5 || 3:00
|-  style="background:#CCFFCC;"
| 2014-05-02 || Win ||align=left| Kurt Finlayson || Cage Soldiers 1 || Australia || Decision (Unanimous) || 5 || 3:00
|-  style="background:#CCFFCC;"
| 2014-02-22 || Win ||align=left|  || Pride and Glory || Australia || Decision (Unanimous) || 5 || 3:00
|-  style="background:#CCFFCC;"
| 2013-10-26 || Win ||align=left| Rhyse Saliba || Real Hero Muay Thai Championship || Sydney, Australia || Decision (Unanimous) || 3 || 3:00
|-  style="background:#CCFFCC;"
| 2013-10-12 || Win ||align=left| Jacob Moulden || Pride and Glory 6 || Australia || Decision || 5 || 3:00
|-  bgcolor="#FFBBBB"
| 2013-08-10 || Loss ||align=left| Tie Yinghua || MAX Muay Thai 3 || Zhengzhou, China || Decision || 3 || 03:00
|-  style="background:#CCFFCC;"
| 2013 || Win ||align=left| Beniah Douma || || Australia || KO || 1 ||
|-  style="background:#CCFFCC;"
| 2013-04-13 || Win ||align=left| ||Fight for Glory || Australia ||  ||  ||
|-  style="background:#CCFFCC;"
| 2013-03-23 || Win||align=left| Magomed Amarof || World Professional Muaythai Championship Marathon 2013 || Bangkok, Thailand || TKO || 4 ||
|-  style="background:#FFBBBB;"
| 2013-03-02 || Loss ||align=left| Toby Smith || Domination 10 || Australia || Decision || 5 || 3:00
|-  style="background:#CCFFCC;"
| 2012-10-23 || Win ||align=left| Angelo Veniero || Thai Fight || Thailand || Decision || 3 || 3:00
|-  style="background:#CCFFCC;"
| 2012-09-21 || Win ||align=left| Yaser Samadi || KO16 || Dubai || Decision || 5 || 3:00
|-  style="background:#CCFFCC;"
| 2012-08-14 || Win ||align=left| Trongchai Kietprapat || X-ONE FIGHT NIGHT || Thailand || Decision || 5 || 3:00
|-  style="background:#CCFFCC;"
| 2012-04-13 || Win ||align=left| Matthew King || Pride and Glory || Australia || Decision || 5 || 3:00
|-  style="background:#CCFFCC;"
| 2012-03-31 || Win ||align=left| Michael Dicks || Muay Thai Grand Prix || England || Decision || 5 || 3:00 
|-
! style=background:white colspan=9 |
|-  style="background:#CCFFCC;"
| 2012-02-04 || Win ||align=left| Chok Eminent air || Boxing Channel 11 || Thailand || Decision || 5 || 3:00
|-  style="background:#CCFFCC;"
| 2012 || Win ||align=left| Khong-fha || Tata Motors sponsored TV Event  || Thailand || Decision || 5 || 3:00
|-  style="background:#CCFFCC;"
| 2011-09-09 || Win ||align=left|  ||  || Réunion || Decision ||  ||
|-  style="background:#FFBBBB;"
| 2010-12-06 || Loss ||align=left| F-16 Rachanon || Lumpinee Stadium || Bangkok, Thailand || Decision || 5 || 3:00
|-  style="background:#FFBBBB;"
| 2010-11-03 || Loss ||align=left| F-16 Rachanon || Lumpinee Stadium || Bangkok, Thailand || Decision || 5 || 3:00
|-  style="background:#cfc;"
| 2010-09-25 || Win||align=left| Phetaswin Seatranferry || Omnoi Stadium || Bangkok, Thailand || KO (High kick)|| 5 ||
|-  style="background:#FFBBBB;"
| 2009-11-24 || Loss ||align=left| Superbon Banchamek || Wanwerapon Fights, Lumpinee Stadium || Bangkok, Thailand || Decision || 5 || 3:00
|-  bgcolor="#FFBBBB"
| 2009-09-26 || Loss ||align=left| Orono Wor Petchpun || Muaythai Lumpinee Krikkrai Fight || Bangkok, Thailand || Decision || 5 || 3:00
|-  bgcolor="#CCFFCC"
| 2009-08-08 || Win ||align=left| Tuantong Phumpanmoung || Lumpinee Stadium, Rangyeh tournament || Bangkok, Thailand || Decision || 5 || 3:00
|-  bgcolor="#FFBBBB"
| 2009-06-13 || Loss ||align=left| Singdam Kiatmuu9 || Lumpinee Stadium || Bangkok, Thailand || Decision || 5 || 3:00
|-  bgcolor="#CCFFCC"
| 2009-05-22 || Win ||align=left| Pansak Luk Bor.Kor || Lumpinee Stadium || Bangkok, Thailand || Decision || 5 || 3:00
|-  bgcolor="#CCFFCC"
| 2009-04-04 || Win ||align=left| Puengnoi Petsupapon || Lumpinee Stadium || Bangkok, Thailand || Decision || 5 || 3:00
|-  bgcolor="#CCFFCC"
| 2009-01-05 || Win ||align=left| Dechasak Sor.Thamapetch || Rajadamnern Stadium || Bangkok, Thailand || Decision || 5 || 3:00
|-  bgcolor="#CCFFCC"
| 2008-12-15 || Win ||align=left| Dechasak Sor.Thamapetch || Rajadamnern Stadium || Bangkok, Thailand || Decision || 5 || 3:00
|-  style="background:#CCFFCC;"
| 2008-08-03 || Win ||align=left| Shiro Utsunomiya || Kick vs Muay Thai ～TARGET 1st～ || Japan || TKO (Doctor Stoppage) || 3 || 2:15

|-  bgcolor="#fbb"
| 2007-05-13 || Loss ||align=left| Yutajak Kaewsamrit || Channel 7 Stadium || Bangkok, Thailand || KO  || 4 ||
|-  style="background:#CCFFCC;"
| 2007-03-11 || Win ||align=left| Chok Eminent air || Channel 7 Stadium || Thailand || Decision || 5 || 3:00
|-  style="background:#CCFFCC;"
| 2007-02-10 || Win ||align=left| Somingphai Kitaponthip || Omnoi Stadium || Thailand || Decision || 5 || 3:00
|-  style="background:#CCFFCC;"
| 2005-04-18 || Win ||align=left| Narongrit Sitpayong || Rajadamnern Stadium || Bangkok, Thailand || Decision || 5 || 3:00
|-
| colspan=9 | Legend:

References

External links
ONE Championship profile

Petchtanong Petchfergus
Living people
Kunlun Fight kickboxers
ONE Championship kickboxers
1985 births
Petchtanong Petchfergus
ONE Championship champions